Diego Luis Valoyes Ruíz (born 22 September 1996) is a Colombian professional footballer who plays as a winger for talleres da Argentina.

Club career
Valoyes began his senior career with La Equidad, after youth spells with Alianza Sport, Fútbol Paz, Los Calamares and Real Cartagena. He made his debut against Categoría Primera B's Tigres in the Copa Colombia in March 2015, prior to featuring in pro league football for the first time on 4 September versus Deportivo Pasto. Almost a year later, in 2016, Valoyes scored his first goal against the same opponents during a 4–0 victory at the Estadio Metropolitano de Techo. In the following campaign of 2017, he netted five times as the club placed eleventh overall. Valoyes left on 28 June 2018 to join Talleres of the Argentine Primera División on loan.

The centre-forward featured fifteen times in all competitions for Talleres in 2018–19, prior to departing back to Colombia on 30 June. However, on 4 July, Talleres resigned Valoyes on loan.

International career
He made his debut for Colombia national football team on 16 November 2021 in a World Cup qualifier against Paraguay.

Career statistics

References

External links

1996 births
Living people
Colombian footballers
Colombian expatriate footballers
Sportspeople from Cartagena, Colombia
Colombia international footballers
Association football forwards
Categoría Primera A players
Argentine Primera División players
La Equidad footballers
Talleres de Córdoba footballers
Expatriate footballers in Argentina
Colombian expatriate sportspeople in Argentina